Alphonse (Alfons) Olterdissen (Maastricht, December 12, 1865 - Maastricht, February 24, 1923) was a Dutch writer, poet and composer who wrote extensively in the Maastrichtian dialect. The final stanza of his opera Trijn de Begijn eventually became the local anthem of Maastricht loosely copy of the Romanian composer Ciprian Porumbescu's (1853-1883) "Pe-al nostru steag e scris Unire".

Biography
Olterdissen was born to a German father and a mother from the province of Zeeland and grew up speaking Dutch, only learning the Maastricht dialect socially. In 1883 he moved to Amsterdam to attend the Rijksschool voor de Kunstnijverheid in order to develop his abilities in painting. After graduating from the Rijksschool he set up a school in Maastricht, without success. Hereafter, Olterdissen focused on promoting tourism to Maastricht.

Olterdissen's lack of business skill led him to gather a significant debt which he tried to alleviate by writing plays and operettas. Initially not achieving much success, his fortunes increased in 1907 with De kaptein vaan Köpenick. This was a play about the then popular Wilhelm Voigt (also known as Hauptmann von Köpenick). A second success story was the comical opera Trijn de Begijn in 1910.

Local anthem
This is the text of the final stanza of Trijn de Begijn, which was adopted in 2002 as the official anthem of the city of Maastricht by its municipal government .

Notes

External links
 
 
 

Dutch people of German descent
Limburgish-language writers
Writers from Maastricht
1865 births
1923 deaths